Wojciech Zyska (born 8 January 1994) is a Polish professional footballer who plays as a midfielder for Gedania Gdańsk.

External links 
 

1994 births
Living people
People from Sztum
Sportspeople from Pomeranian Voivodeship
Association football midfielders
Polish footballers
Poland youth international footballers
Ekstraklasa players
I liga players
II liga players
III liga players
Lechia Gdańsk players
Wisła Płock players
Bałtyk Gdynia players
Gwardia Koszalin players
Sokół Ostróda players
Olimpia Elbląg players
Gedania 1922 Gdańsk players